Ed Nickla (August 11, 1933 - November 2, 2021) was a Canadian Football League player as a linebacker and defensive tackle. He became a 2-time east division All-Star for the Montreal Alouettes in 1962 and 1963.

Career 
After playing football at the University of Tennessee in 1951 and 1952, the US Air Force in 1953-1956 at Bolling Air Force Base in Washington D.C., and the University of Maryland in 1958, Ed Nickla joined the Chicago Bears in 1959, though drafted by them back in 1955. Nickla played only one season with Chicago in 1959.  

After sitting out the entire 1960 season, Nickla joined the Montreal Alouettes in 1961 as an inside linebacker, a defensive tackle, and a middle guard.

Recognition 
Nickla was voted as an East All-Star in 1962 at inside linebacker and in 1963 at defensive tackle. In 1962, he intercepted four passes. However, he was released by the Alouettes after playing only two games in 1964 for being too slow. Though picked up by the Toronto Argonauts for eight more games that same year, he never played another season.

References

1933 births
2021 deaths
Montreal Alouettes players
Toronto Argonauts players
American players of Canadian football
Canadian football linebackers
Canadian football defensive linemen
Players of American football from New York City
Tennessee Volunteers football players
Maryland Terrapins football players